František Sokol (5 February 1939, in Tišnov – 11 October 2011, in Ostrava) is a Czech former volleyball player who competed for Czechoslovakia in the 1968 Summer Olympics.

In 1968 he was part of the Czechoslovak team which won the bronze medal in the Olympic tournament. He played eight matches.

External links

František Sokol's obituary

1939 births
2011 deaths
People from Tišnov
Czech men's volleyball players
Czechoslovak men's volleyball players
Olympic volleyball players of Czechoslovakia
Volleyball players at the 1968 Summer Olympics
Olympic bronze medalists for Czechoslovakia
Olympic medalists in volleyball
Medalists at the 1968 Summer Olympics
Sportspeople from the South Moravian Region